Snow Hill, also known as Booth House, is a historic home located near Gwaltney Corner, Surry County, Virginia.  It was built in 1836, and is a -story, five bay, I-house style frame dwelling.  It has a gable roof, exterior end chimneys, and a single pile, central-hall plan. The interior features special decorative treatment of the woodwork in imitation of fine woods and marbles.

It was listed on the National Register of Historic Places in 1979.

References

External links

Snow Hill, State Route 40, Carsley, Surry County, VA: 10 measured drawings and 7 data pages at Historic American Buildings Survey

: copyrighted photographs taken of the site by Douglas W. Reynolds, Jr. in March 2015.

Historic American Buildings Survey in Virginia
Houses on the National Register of Historic Places in Virginia
Houses completed in 1836
National Register of Historic Places in Surry County, Virginia
Houses in Surry County, Virginia